Opihi is a small rural district located in the Timaru District, New Zealand. It is located just north of Pleasant Point and just to the west of Temuka. Richard Pearse lived in the area and conducted his 1903 experiments in powered flight along the banks of the Opihi River.

Opihi is the site of 14 limestone caves and overhangs that contains pre-historic Māori rock art significant to New Zealand archaeology. The site around the Opihi River and is a cluster of 18 rock art sites.

References

External links
 "Official website of Timaru District Council"
 "Opihi College"

Populated places in Canterbury, New Zealand